A letter of thanks or thank-you letter is a letter that is used when one person/party wishes to express appreciation to another.  Personal thank-you letters are sometimes hand-written in cases in which the addressee is a friend, acquaintance or relative. Thank-you letters are also sometimes referred to as letters of gratitude. These types of thank-you letters are usually written as formal business letters.

Some psychological research indicates that expressing gratitude by writing such letters can have emotional benefits, but this does not apply to all circumstances. News media have covered the tradition of handwritten letters of thanks from a cultural perspective, suggesting in particular that the extra effort represented by handwriting (as opposed to text messaging, for example) makes these letters more emotionally significant for sender and recipient alike.

Good thank you letters can benefit from using a recognized format.

References

Further reading
 

thanks, Letter of
Gratitude